Dave Parletti (born 22 April 1983) is an English professional darts player who plays in events of the World Darts Federation.

Career
In 2017, Parletti won the Jersey Classic. In 2018, he won the Welsh Masters and the Winmau Wolverhampton Open, and also reached the Last 16 of the 2018 World Masters. In 2019, he won the Welsh Classic, after defeating Martin Adams in the final, whilst earlier in the year he picked up the Romanian Open, beating Gary Robson in the final 6-5.

World Championship results

BDO/WDF
 2019: First round (lost to Krzysztof Kciuk 1–3)
 2020: First round (lost to Chris Landman 2–3)
 2022: Second round (lost to Andy Baetens 1–3)

External links
 Dave Parletti's profile and stats on Darts Database

References

Living people
English darts players
British Darts Organisation players
1983 births